Fifteen pieces of the Kainsaz meteorite were seen to fall near Kainsaz, Muslyumovo, Tatarstan on September 13, 1937. Kainsaz is the only observed fall in Tatarstan.

History

Mineralogy
Most of the chondrules (90 %) are either droplet (39 %) or lithic (61 %). The remaining 10 % are barred olivine, radial pyroxene, cryptocrystalline, glassy, sulfide-metal, micro-poikilitic and complex chondrules.

Classification
Kainsaz is classified as a CO3.2. This stands for CO group, petrologic type = 3, and subtype = 2. The group is part of the CM-CO clan and a member of the carbonaceous chondrites.

See also
 Glossary of meteoritics

References

Meteorites found in Russia